Count Alfredo Caruana Gatto (3 September 1868 – 15 October 1926) was a Maltese lawyer, politician and naturalist.

He was born on 3 September 1868 in Valletta to Antonio Caruana Gatto and Vincenza Formosa. He studied at the University of Malta, graduating with a BA in 1889 and a LL.D. in 1892. He specialised in criminal law, and he was briefly appointed assistant crown advocate in 1901.

Caruana Gatto was a member of several government committees throughout his career. He later entered politics, joining the Maltese Political Union (UPM) party under the leadership of Ignazio Panzavecchia. He was elected to the Senate of Malta as a representative of the nobility in the 1921 election, and he was Minister of Justice between 1921 and 1922. In 1926, he joined the Nationalist Party when the latter was formed from the merger of the UPM with the Democratic Nationalist Party. He remained a Senator until his death.

On 1 April 1926, Caruana Gatto allegedly purchased two sheets of a newly-issued postage stamp with a unique printing error which were then sold to speculators for a profit. He died a few months later on 15 October 1926 at the age of 58. A minor controversy later arose about how the stamps had been acquired, but the findings of a 1930 investigation on the matter by a government-appointed committee were inconclusive.

References 

1868 births
1926 deaths
20th-century Maltese politicians
University of Malta alumni
Justice ministers of Malta
20th-century Maltese lawyers
Maltese naturalists
Maltese Political Union politicians
Nationalist Party (Malta) politicians
People from Valletta
19th-century Maltese lawyers